Thumbsucker is the soundtrack to the film of the same name, which is based in the novel of the same name by Walter Kirn. It was released on September 13, 2005, under the Hollywood Records label. It was originally intended to be created by Elliott Smith, but after his death in 2003, The Polyphonic Spree was chosen to complete it when director Mike Mills attended a performance of theirs and was impressed. Three tracks by Smith remain on the release.

Track listing

References

The Polyphonic Spree albums
Elliott Smith albums
Good Records albums
2005 soundtrack albums
Hollywood Records soundtracks
Pop soundtracks
Comedy film soundtracks
Drama film soundtracks